Paul Sarasin, full name Paul Benedict Sarasin (11 December 1856 – 7 April 1929) was a Swiss naturalist and ethnologist. He is known as founder of National parks in Switzerland.

Life and work

Paul Sarasin studied medicine and natural science at the University of Basel with Leopold Ruetimeyer, where he also met Fritz Sarasin, and at the University of Würzburg. His dissertation had the title "Die Entwicklungsgeschichte der Bithynia tentaculata" and was about the developmental history of a small aquatic snail.

Paul Sarasin was a second cousin of Fritz Sarasin. Paul and Fritz did not only work and travel together for scientific purposes but also had a close livelong friendship. Both had their origins in the rich and powerful patrician families (Patriziat), which ruled their native city of Basel at this time.

The Sarasins conducted research in various fields within the natural sciences, and they amassed a collection of zoological and geological objects (like Molluscs). They later developed interests both in anthropology and ethnology; they photographed and interviewed people, noted measurements of the human body, recorded their language, and collected works of art.

Paul and Fritz Sarasin made several scientific expeditions to Ceylon (now Sri Lanka) and Celebes (now Sulawesi). After their first journey to Ceylon 1883-1886 they stayed 1886-1893 in Berlin for evaluation and publication of results. 1890, 1902 and 1907 they travelled again to Ceylon and 1893-1896 to Celebes. After staying from 1896-1902 in Basel they went from 1902-1903 a second time to Celebes.

In Celebes they tried to solve an open scientific question related to the theory of evolution of Charles Darwin and Alfred Russel Wallace, about a detail concerned with the geographical distribution of plants and animals called the Wallace Line, that is whether Celebes belonged in this regard more to Asia or to Australia. A network of scientists publishing in English, German, French and Dutch competed for a solution to this problem. Instead of a sharp line the Sarasins proposed a zone of gradual change and asked for research about the kind of connections of land which would explain the existing populations.

In the context of the question of the origin and evolution of man Wallace had proposed a second line, hence called Wallace's other line east of the first line, separating two distinct groups of men: the Malay people in the West and the Papuan people in the East. To clarify this problem the Sarasins explored different groups and tribes in Ceylon and Celebes, which they saw as varieties of men created differently by evolution and at different stages of biological and cultural development. In Ceylon they visited and studied intensively a tribe called Weddas which they considered to be the oldest and original population of Ceylon, living mostly as hunters in the mountains and inner parts of Ceylon. They compared them to other groups in Ceylon, the Tamils and the Sinhalese. Later the Sarasins found a group of people in Celebes, in their opinion similar to the Weddas, the Toala and Toraja.

For their research the Sarasins crossed Celebes seven times on different routes. Since the island was at this time only loosely controlled by the colonial administration of the Netherlands, they had to travel through mostly unknown areas of the nearly independent kingdoms of Luwu, Sidenreng and Bone. These kingdoms belonged to the cultural groups named Bugis or Makassars. Hierarchically structured, each with a king on top, elected by noble families, and an associated parliament of lower nobles, they competed for power and resources, like slaves, to produce coffee and spices, which they sold to the world-market. Lower groups of the Bugis and tribes from the inner mountainous parts of Celebes, like the Toraja, lived in a kind of slavery. According to the scientist B.C.Schär, the research of the Sarasin later led to the inclusion of these areas into the Dutch colonial imperium.

When Fritz Sarasin travelled 1910 - 1911 to the islands of New Caledonia in the South Pacific, he met there with another ethnologist from Basel Felix Speiser, who at this time did research on the New Hebrides.

Paul and Fritz could finance their research from their own, mostly inherited, wealth.

From 1906-1912, Paul Sarasin was President of the commission for the Ethnological Museum of Basel. Paul and Fritz donated their rich collections to the Ethnological Museum. Alone from Celebes they brought back to Basel 1000 animals and plants, as well as 680 ethnographic objects and 600 photos. Along with Hermann Fischer-Sigwart, Jakob Heierli, Albert Heim, Hans Schardt, Carl Schroter, Ernest Wiczek, and Friedrich Zschokke, they were the founders of the Schweizerische Naturschutzkommission (the Swiss Nature Conservation Commission).

At the age of 62, Paul married in 1918 Anna Maria Hohenester and got two children with her.

Taxa named in his honor 
Paul and Fritz Sarasin are commemorated in the scientific names of five species of reptiles:
 Amphiesma sarasinorum, 
 Correlophus sarasinorum, 
 Nessia sarasinorum, 
 Pseudorabdion sarasinorum, and 
Sphenomorphus sarasinorum.
And fish:
 Sarasin's goby Mugilogobius sarasinorum is named in the cousins honor.

Bibliography 
  Sarasin P. & Sarasin F. (1898–1901). "Materialien zur Naturgeschichte der Insel Celebes". Kreidel's Verlag, Wiesbaden.
 (1898). Band 1: Die Süsswasser-Mollusken von Celebes.
 (1899). Band 2: Die Land-Mollusken von Celebes. I-VIII, 1-248, pls 1-31.
 (1901). Band 3: Über die geologische Geschichte der Insel Celebes auf Grund der Thierverbreitung
 (1901). Band 4: Entwurf einer geographisch-geologischen Beschreibung der Insel Celebes / Untersuchung einiger Gesteinssuiten, gesammelt in Celebes von Paul & Fritz Sarasin; von C. Schmidt.
  Sarasin P. & Sarasin F. (1905). Reisen in Celebes. Wiesbaden. Volume 1, Volume 2.
  Sarasin P. & Sarasin F. "Ergebnisse naturwissenschaftlicher Forschungen auf Ceylon". ["Results of Natural History Research in Ceylon."] Wiesbaden.
 (1887–1893). Band 1–3.
 (1908). "Band 4: Die Steinzeit auf Ceylon". [Volume Four: The Stone Age of Ceylon.] translated by David Bulbeck: English translation PDF.

Further reading 
 
 Bernhard C. Schär: Tropenliebe. Schweizer Naturforscher und niederländischer Imperialismus in Südostasien um 1900. Campus Verlag, Frankfurt am Main 2015, .
 Eduard His: Basler Gelehrte des 19. Jahrhunderts. Benno Schwabe & Co., Basel 1941, S. 364 - 372.

References

External links 
  works by Paul Sarasin in the catalog of the German National Library
  Paul Sarasin in the Historical Dictionary of Switzerland
 

Swiss naturalists
Swiss ethnologists
1856 births
1929 deaths